A list of roads in Kyrgyzstan.

Systems 
The highways in Kyrgyzstan are divided into two groups, based on the level of their significance whose names differ by a code letter.
 ЭМ – highways of international significance (El aralık magistral); ЭМ-01 to ЭМ-23
 М – highways of national significance (Mamlekettik magistral); М-001 to М-122

International Highways

National Highways 
{| class="wikitable"
|- class="hintergrundfarbe6"
! Road !! Direction !! Length
|----
|  ||  - Bishkek || 12.4 km
|----
|  || Osh City Bypass || 11.7 km
|----
|  || Krasnaya Rechka - Ysyk-Ata Resort || 44 km
|----
|  || Bishkek - Koy-Tash - Ysyk-Ata Resort || 42.1 km
|----
|  || Tokmok - Döng-Aryk - Rot-Front - Ivanovka || 44.4
|----
|  || Kegeti - East Karakol River (near Döng-Alysh) || 52.6 km
|----
|  || Manas International Airport - Kamyshanovka || 31.2 km
|----
|  || Bishkek - Kün-Tuu - ShopokovBranch to Malovodnoye || 26.6 km
|----
|  || Chong-Aryk - Ala-Archa Nature Park || 31.5
|----
|  || Lugovoy ( - Dacha-Su || 32.0 km
|----
|  || Mayevka -  - Ala-Archa Reservoir || 11 km
|----
|  || Chong-Aryk - Zarechnoye - Koy-Tash || 20.8 km
|----
|  || Petrovka - Keper-Aryk - Narzan Spring (Ak-Suu) || 50.8 km
|----
|  || Panfilov  - Birinchi May || 18.8 km
|----
|  || Kara-Balta - Stepnoye || 41.4 km
|----
|  || Belovodskoye - Tölök || 31.7 km
|----
|  || Belovodskoye - Sugar Factiry || 2.6 km
|----
|  || Sosnovka - Keper-Aryk || 8 km
|----
|  || Romanovka - Kamyshanovka || 45.4 km
|----
|  || Petrovka - Oil Storage Facility (Zavodskoye) || 2.2 km 
|----
|  || Poltavka - Besh-Terek || 23.7 km
|----
|  || Kemin - Ilyich - Ak-Tüz || 33.9 km
|----
|  || Boroldoy - Jol-Bulak -  || 13.1 km
|----
|  ||  - Shabdan - Kok-Oyrok || 60.6 km
|----
|  || Kemin - Orlovka || 11.5 km
|----
|  || Orlovka - Madaniyat - Shamshy || 19.6 km
|----
|  || Orlovka - Jangy-Alysh || 8.0 km
|----
|  || Orlovka - Chym-Korgon || 13.7 km
|----
|  || Kant - Khun Chi - Border of Kazakhstan || 12.3 km
|----
|  || Kant - Asphalt and Cement Factory || 1.5 km
|----
|  || Tokmok - Shamshy - Tuyuk || 43.9 km
|----
|  || Tokmok - Koshoy || 16.6 km
|----
|  || Dorozhnoye - Jel-Aryk - Cholok -  || 13.8 km
|----
|  || Kyzyl-Adyr - Kanysh-Kyya || 147 km 
|----
|  || Kyzyl-Adyr - Amanbaev - Maymak || 28.1 km
|----
|  || Talas - Besh-Tash Nature Park || 41 km
|----
|  || Talas - Kök-Oy - Nyldy - Kayyngdy  || 33.3 km
|----
|  || Kök-Oy - Kyzyl-Tuu || 14.4 km
|----
|  || Talas - Yntymak - Bakay-Ata || 31.6 km
|----
|  || Kyzyl-Tuu - Tash-Aryk - Manas Ordo Kyrgyz national complex || 3.4 km
|----
|  || Bakay-Ata - Kyzyl-Say || 6.9 km
|----
|  || Amanbaev - Babakhan River Valey - Tyuz Ashuu Mountain Peak || 53 km
|----
|  || Kayyngdy - Pokrovka -  || 30.6 km
|----
|  || Karakol - Ak-Suu (Teploklyuchenka) - Ak-Bulung - Sary-Jaz River - Engilchek || 136 km
|----
|  || Barskoon - Söök - Kara-Sai - Yshtyk - Ak-Shyirak || 186 km
|----
|  || Söök - Karakolka - Kubergenty || 62 km
|----
|  || Karkyra - Turuk - Sary-Jaz River valley - Ottuk River || 95 km
|----
|  ||  - Mikhaylovka - Toguz-Bulak - Toktoyan - Sary-Tologoy || 82.0 km
|----
|  || Grigor'yevka - Grigor'yevka Pristany (Shore of Issyk-Kul) || 7.0 km
|----
|  || Ak-Bulak - Kürmöntü - Ak-Bulun Monastery || 6.5 km
|----
|  ||  Ottuk - Semiz Bel Pass - Semiz-Bel || 58 km
|----
|  || Ak-Suu (Teploklyuchenka) - Ak-Suu Hot Springs || 6.6 km
|----
|  ||  - Tepke - Kachybek - Sovetskoye - Kök-Jayyk || 57.5 km 
|----
|  || Boz-Uchuk - Novovoznesenovka -  Sovetskoye - Jyrgalang Coal Mine || 31.0 km
|----
|  || Bökönbaev - Toguz-Bulak - Döng-Talaa - Kara-Talaa || 96 km
|----
|  || Bökönbaev - Kajy-Saz - Tosor River Valley - Tosor Pass - Jyluu-Suu River Valley -  (Tamdy-Suu) || 130 km
|----
|  || Karakol - Pristan'-Przheval'sk - Mikhaylovka || 13.2 km
|----
|  || Koi-Sary Military Base - Lipenka - Jeti-Ögüz - Jeti-Ögüz resort || 31.0 km
|----
|  || Kyzyl-Suu - Pokrovka Pristany || 8.0 km 
|----
|  ||  - Ottuk || 12.2 km
|---- 
|  || Kochkor - Kara-Too - Kum-Döbö - Kochkor || 41.0 km
|----
|  || Kochkor - Döng-Alysh - East Karakol River Pass || 39.0 km
|----
|  || Char - Ak-Muz || 13.9 km
|----
|  || Sary-Bulak - Tölök - Song-Köl River || 60.9 km
|----
|  || Naryn - Döbölü - Tash-Bashat - Eki-Naryn  - Örük-Tam || 74.5 km
|----
|  || Sary-Bulak - Ak-Kyya - Tamdy-Suu - Örük-Tam || 118 km
|----
|  ||  - Lakol - Jer-Köchkü || 21.0 km
|----
|  || Baetov - Terek -  || 71 km
|----
|  || Naryn - Ak-Tal - Ügüt - Baetov || 124 km
|----
|  || Ügüt - Kara-Bürgön || 35.5 km
|----
|  || Baetov - Kara-Bürgön - Kosh-Döbö - Makmal || 119 km
|----
|  || Echki-Bashy (On-Archa) - Jerge-Tal - Ak-Kuduk || 70 km
|----
|  || At-Bashy - Ak-Muz - Torugart || 187 km
|----
|  || Aral - Sary-Bulung - Ming-Kush || 35 km
|----
|  || Eki-Naryn - Keng-Saz || 18.5 km
|----
|  ||  Kazarman - Ak-Tal (Road number  also assigned to the same stretch of route) || 128 km
|----
|  || Ak-Tal - Kara-Oy - Kadyraly || 20 km
|----
|  || Ak-Tal (Kurtka River) - Song-Köl River || 73.5 km
|----
|  ||  - At-Bashy || 6.9 km
|----
|  ||   - Tash Rabat || 15.0 km
|----
|  ||  (Near Border Outpost) - Müdürüm River Valley - Üzönggükuush River Valley - Orto-Kashka-Suu Border Outpost || 162 km
|----
|  || Suusamyr - Karakol River Valey - East Karakol River (near Döng-Alysh) || 94.5 km
|----
|  || Torkent - Toluk - Kyzyl-Oy || 149 km
|----
|  || Toktogul - Ak-Tektir - Besh-Tash - Kara-Künggöy || 47.5 km
|----
|  || Osh - Aravan - Köchübaev - Border of Uzbekistan || 33.5 km
|----
|  || Osh - Kashgar-Kyshtak - Kara-Suu - Savay - Border of UzbekistanBranch:Kara-Suu - Tash-Aryk || 32.3 km17.7 km
|----
|  || Karavan - Nayman - Kerkidan - Border of Uzbekistan || 32.3 km
|----
|  || Osh - Osh Airport - Kashgar-Kyshtak || 12.7 km
|----
|  || Osh - Özgür || 11 km
|----
|  || Nookat - Aravan - Tepe-Korgon - Border of Uzbekistan || 51.5 km
|----
|  || Bujum - Batken - Kyzyl-Bel - Border of Tajikistan || 16.5 km
|----
|  || Myrza-Ake - Kara-Shoro Nature Park || 68.5 km
|----
|  || Özgön (Jylandy) - Jiyde (Iyri-Suu) - Boz-Chichkan (Barpi) || 51 km
|----
|  || Kurshab - Kurbu-Tash - Tuz-Bel || 24 km
|----
|  || Kayragach - Kulundu - Arka - Border to Tajikistan || 36 km
|----
|  || Osh - Tölöykön || 9 km
|----
|  || Ak-Terek - Papan - Kojo-KelengBranch:Papan - Kara-Sögöt || 72 km10 km
|----
|  || Otuz-Adyr - Keng-Say || 14 km
|----
|  || Ylay-Talaa - Gülchö || 56 km 
|----
|  || Nookat - Papan || 36 km
|----
|  || Üch-Korgon - Daroot-Korgon || 115 km
|----
|  || Tash-Kömür - Tegene - Kerben || 97 km
|----
|  || Tash-Kömür - Kyzyl-Jar || 20 km 
|----
|  || Shamaldy-Say - Kerben - Ala-Buka - Kanysh-Kyya || 252 km
|----
|  || Ala-Buka - Baymak - Border of Uzbekistan || 12.5 km
|----
|  || Ak-Tam/Japa-Saldy - Ak-Korgon - Bayastan || 21.5 km
|----
|  || Shekaftar - Ayry-Tam - Border of Uzbekistan || 16 km
|----
|  || Yzar - Safedbulan - Border of Uzbekistan || 18 km
|----
|  || Taran-Bazar - Kara-Alma || 8.8 km
|----
|  || Taran-Bazar - Kalmak-Kyrchyn(To be replaced along its length by  "alternative North-South highway") || 17 km
|----
|  || Suzak - Kadu || 42 km
|----
|  || Suzak - Tösh (Kara-Daryya) || 22 km
|----
|  || Bazar-Korgon - Charbak - ArslanbobBranch: Charbak - Kyzyl-Üngkür || 45.5 km17 km
|----
|  || Bürgöndü - Mayluu-Suu || 23 km
|----
|  || Suzak Ring Road(Such road doesn't exist on the ground) || 
|----
|  ||
|----
|  || Jalal-Abad - Bek-Abad - Border of Uzbekistan || 13 km
|}

Asian Highways
Several of the highway of the Asian Highway Network cross Tajikistan. These include the following:

 
  ЭМ-01 Road: Border of Kazakhstan - Bishkek
  ЭМ-02 Road: Bishkek Bypass
  ЭМ-04 Road: Bishkek - Kara-Balta
  ЭМ-03 Road: Kara-Balta - Chaldovar - Border of Kazakhstan

 
  ЭМ-03 Road: Border of Kazakhstan - Chaldovar - Kara-Balta
  ЭМ-04 Road: Kara-Balta - Osh
  ЭМ-15 Road: Osh - Border of Uzbekistan

 
  ЭМ-11 Road: Border of China - Torugart Pass - Bishkek
  ЭМ-01 Road: Bishkek - Georgievka - Border of Kazakhstan

 
  ЭМ-05 Road: Border of China - Irkeshtam - Sary-Tash 
  ЭМ-06 Road: Sary-Tash - Karamyk - Border of Tajikistan
 (Branch)''  ЭМ-05 Road:  Sary-Tash - Osh

E-Roads
Several of the highway of the International E-road network cross Tajikistan. These include the following:

  ЭМ-03 Road: Border of Kazakhstan - Chaldovar - Kara-Balta  
  ЭМ-04 Road: Kara-Balta - Bishkek 
  ЭМ-02 Road: Bishkek Bypass
  ЭМ-01 Road: Bishkek - Border of Kazakhstan

  ЭМ-06 Road: Border of Tajikistan - Karamyk - Sary-Tash
  ЭМ-05 Road: Sary-Tash - Irkeshtam - Border of China 

  ЭМ-01 Road: Border of Kazakhstan - Georgievka - Bishkek
  ЭМ-11 Road: Bishkek - Torugart Pass - Border of China 

 ЭМ-15 Road: Border of Uzbekistan - Osh (Connects to )
 ЭМ-05 Road: Osh - Taldyk Pass - Sary-Tash (Start of concurrency with ) - Erkeshtam (at the border to China)

  ЭМ-04 Road: Bishkek - Kara-Balta - Jalal-Abad - Osh

  ЭМ-08 Road: Tüp - Sary-Tologoy - Border of Kazakhstan

References
Law on classification of roads in Kyrgyzstan, including a full list. (Kyrgyz). http://cbd.minjust.gov.kg/act/view/ky-kg/100245 (Archive)

See also
 Roads in Armenia
 Roads in Azerbaijan
 Roads in Georgia (country)
 Roads in Kazakhstan
 Roads in Tajikistan